Nina Mary Benita Douglas-Hamilton, Duchess of Hamilton (née Nina Mary Benita Poore; 13 May 1878 – 12 January 1951) was an English peeress and animal rights activist.

Early life

Douglas-Hamilton was born on 13 May 1878 in Nether Wallop, Hampshire. She was the youngest daughter of Major Robert Poore and Juliana Benita Lowry-Corry; her mother was a daughter of Rear Admiral Armar Lowry Corry.

Personal life
Three years after her brother, Major Robert Poore, married Flora Douglas-Hamilton, on 4 December 1901 Nina married Flora's brother Alfred Douglas-Hamilton, 13th Duke of Hamilton, at the parish church of Newton Tony, Wiltshire, not far from her parents' home at Winterslow. Together, they were the parents of four sons and three daughters:
 Douglas Douglas-Hamilton, 14th Duke of Hamilton
 Lady Jean Douglas-Hamilton
 George Douglas-Hamilton, 10th Earl of Selkirk
 Lady Margaret Douglas-Hamilton
 Lord Malcolm Douglas-Hamilton
 Lord David Douglas-Hamilton
 Lady Mairi Nina Douglas-Hamilton

Douglas-Hamilton refused to be operated on for a throat condition due to her opinions on medical research, and when the condition worsened, she refused antibiotics. The condition led to her death on 12 January 1951, at her London house. The funeral service was held in Salisbury Cathedral and the burial was at Berwick St John, near Shaftesbury.

Philanthropy
Douglas-Hamilton was very proud of her father's work in helping agricultural labourers at Winterslow and was philanthropic towards the group, but kept her gifts secret from all but the recipients. Another gift was sufficient to completely equip and furnish a home for nurses at Bo'ness, West Lothian.

She was a co-founder in 1903 of the Animal Defence and Anti-Vivisection Society, with Lizzy Lind af Hageby, a society which set up three veterinary hospitals for horses during World War I, and campaigned against cruelty to animals including the use of animals in war. In 1912 she became a founder of the Scottish Society for the Prevention of Vivisection, which went on to become Advocates for Animals. She also established Ferne Animal Sanctuary, at Ferne House in Dorset, the estate she and her husband owned. She compiled an illustrated book related to the sanctuary called Chronicles of Ferne, published in 1951.

Legacy
A Princess Coronation Class steam locomotive was named after her, which is on static display at the National Railway Museum, York. The Duchess Nina Institute in the village of Quarter, near Hamilton, Scotland, was a gift to the villagers by the Duke and Duchess of Hamilton and was formally opened on 24 September 1910.

See also
 List of animal rights advocates

Notes

External links 
 The Duchess Nina Institute – Hamilton Observer, 1 October 1910
 

Hamilton, Nina Mary Benita Douglas-Hamilton, Duchess of
Hamilton, Nina Mary Benita Douglas-Hamilton, Duchess of
Douglas-Hamilton, Nina Mary Benita
English animal rights activists
Hamilton, Nina Douglas-Hamilton, Duchess of
Anti-vivisectionists